New Palin is a town in the Kra Daadi district of Arunachal Pradesh and camp office of the district Administration of Kra Daadi district. Inhabited by Nyishi tribe, it is the largest town of the Kra Daadi District. It is located at Latitude 28.15285, Longitude 94.12288. It has a population of 9896 as per 2011 census.

Geography
It has an average elevation of 1080 metres (3540 feet).

Climate
Palin falls within 15' to 20' temperature zone; often the temperature falls to 5–7 °C in winter. The region is very cold during winter and very hot during summer. Rainfall is very high due to very hilly and high geographical terrain. Most of time it is covered by clouds. The area is windy in nature.

Culture
Palin and its adjoining areas are mainly populated by people of the Nyishi tribe.

Holy Rosary church: Consecrated by the Bishop of Itanagar, this Christian catholic church reflects the extensive Christian influence and provides good views of Palin and the surrounding countryside.

Places of interest

Holy Rosary Catholic Church is one of the largest Catholic Churches in the state. It is located at a hilltop in the town.

Palin river one of the tributaries of Subansiri  flows through this town. The river is ideal for rafting, fishing and picnic and outings alike.

Education
Government Model College, Nangbia District’s first college.

Govt Hr. Sec. School Palin, Established in 1957 is a premier public institution supported by government of Arunachal Pradesh and affiliated to CBSE, New Delhi. The school provides quality education from class nine to twelve. It has nurtured huge numbers of bureaucrats, technocrats, political leaders. Some of whom occupies powerful position of authority in government of Arunachal Pradesh. It is also lone school that provides quality education up to class twelve in the entire district.

Don Bosco School, Kasturba Gandhi Balika Vidyalaya(Lumba) ,Jawahar Navodaya Vidyalaya,(Lumba).

There are various other private schools offering education up to upper primary level.

Festivals
Nyokum is the main festival celebrated in the town. Besides Nyokum, residents also celebrate Christmas with overwhelming enthusiasm.

Demography
 India census, Palin has a population of 11251.
The Nyishis are the aborigines of the area.
Vast majority of denizens of the town are christian.

Telecommunication and road  Connectivity
The District Highway connects Palin to the other parts of the state. Uninterrupted Bus and Tata sumo services are available from Naharlagun, Itanagar and Ziro regularly.
BSNL is the first network that  was set up in 2008 but as of June 2017 telecom networks that provides services are Airtel, Vodafone and BSNL.

References

External links 
 ITANAGAR by India travel portal
1962 Border War between India and China(Henderson brook report)
 Contact List for all Important Government Officials in Itanagar Includes Police, Telephone, Electricity and more

See also 
 Palin, Arunachal Pradesh
 Yazali, Arunachal Pradesh

Cities and towns in Kurung Kumey district
Tourism in Northeast India